Henry IV, Prince of Anhalt-Bernburg (died 7 July 1374) was a German prince of the House of Ascania and ruler of the principality of Anhalt-Bernburg.

He was the second son of Bernhard III, Prince of Anhalt-Bernburg, by his first wife Agnes, daughter of Rudolf I, Duke of Saxe-Wittenberg.

Life
Bypassed by his older brother Bernhard IV as ruler of Anhalt-Bernburg, he only assumed rule of the principality when Bernhard died in 1354. In addition to his princely title, he also adopted the style "Lord of Bernburg".

Marriage and issue
Henry married Sophie, possibly a member of the House of Stolberg. They had three children:
Bernhard V, Prince of Anhalt-Bernburg (died 24 June 1420)
Rudolph (III) (died 28 November 1406), Bishop of Halberstadt (1401–1406)
Adelheid (died aft. 2 February 1374), Abbess of Gernrode (1348–1374).

After his death, his son Bernhard was bypassed in his rights over Bernburg in favor of Henry's younger half-brother Otto, who succeeded him.

Princes of Anhalt-Bernburg
1374 deaths
Year of birth unknown
Place of birth unknown